Westwood Historic District is a national historic district located at Muncie, Delaware County, Indiana. It encompasses 83 contributing buildings and 1 contributing site in a predominantly residential section of Muncie.  The district developed after 1923, and includes notable examples of Colonial Revival, Tudor Revival, and Bungalow / American Craftsman style architecture.  Notable buildings include the William H. Ball House (1925), Alexander Bracken House (1937), Michael Broderick House (1928), Bennett Heath House (c. 1930), and Fred Kencht House (1932).

It was added to the National Register of Historic Places in 1992.

References

External links

Historic districts on the National Register of Historic Places in Indiana
Colonial Revival architecture in Indiana
Tudor Revival architecture in Indiana
Houses in Muncie, Indiana
Historic districts in Muncie, Indiana
National Register of Historic Places in Muncie, Indiana